Terpsichore was one of the classical Greek Muses. She was the Muse of dance and the dramatic chorus.

Terpsichore may also refer to:
 Terpsichore (1612), a compendium of more than 300 instrumental dances by Michael Praetorius
 Terpsichore (Petipa/Pugni), a ballet by Marius Petipa and Cesare Pugni
 Terpsichore (plant), a genus of ferns
 81 Terpsichore, an asteroid
 HMS Terpsichore, any of several ships of the Royal Navy, including:
 HMS Terpsichore (R33), a T-class destroyer active during World War II
 Terpsicore (1734), prologue by Handel to his opera Il pastor fido